Udinese Calcio, commonly referred to as Udinese, is a professional Italian football club based in Udine, Friuli-Venezia Giulia, that currently plays in Serie A. It was founded on 30 November 1896 as a sports club, and on 5 July 1911 as a football club.

The traditional team home kit is black and white striped shirt, black shorts, and white socks. The club broadcasts on channel 110 (Udinese Channel) on digital terrestrial television in the north-east of Italy. It has many fans in Friuli and the surrounding areas.

History

Foundation and early years
Udinese Calcio was established in 1896 as part of the Società Udinese di Ginnastica e Scherma, (Udinese Society of Gymnastics and Fencing). In its inaugural year, the club won the Torneo FNGI in Treviso beating Ferrara 2–0; however, this title is not recognised as official.

On 5 July 1911, some gymnasts of Udinese, headed by Luigi Dal Dan, founded the A.C. Udinese, which joined the FIGC. The new side made its debut in a friendly match against Juventus Palmanova, and won 6–0.

It was only in 1912–13 that Udinese first took part in an official FIGC championship. In that year they enrolled in the Campionato Veneto di Promozione, which consisted of just three teams (the others were Petrarca and Padova). With two victories against Padova (3–1 and 5–0), Udinese finished the tournament in second place behind Petrarca and were promoted to first-level Prima Categoria. In Prima Categoria, Udinese failed to reach the national stage, always knocked out in the Eliminatoria Veneta.

1920s: Coppa Italia final
The 1920–21 season, which ended with the Friulani eliminated in the Eliminatoria Veneta, was memorable because it was the debut of Gino Bellotto, who is still the player who has played the most seasons with Udinese, spending 17 seasons with the Zebrette.

In 1922, Udinese, taking advantage of the absence of big clubs, entered the FIGC Italian Football Championship and reached the Coppa Italia final losing 1–0 against Vado, thanks to an overtime goal.

In the league, Udinese finished second in Girone Eliminatorio Veneto, which allowed them to remain in the top flight for the next season, despite a reform of the championships that reduced the number of teams in the competition.

The 1922–23 season was a disastrous one for Udinese, as they came last in and were relegated to the second division. The team risked failure for debts in 1923. On 24 August 1923, AS Udinese separated from AC Udinese Friuli, and the club was forced to set up a budget and an autonomous board. All debts were paid by President Alessandro Del Torso through the sale of some of his paintings and Udinese could thus join the Second Division in which they came fourth.

The 1924–25 season was memorable. The team was included in Group F II Division. The championship was very even and at the end of the tournament three teams were in contention to win: Udinese, Vicenza and Olympia River. Playoffs were needed to determine who would reach the final round.

Udinese beat Olympia in a playoff 1–0 and drew 1–1 with Vicenza. In the play-off standings, Udinese and Vicenza were still in the lead with 3 points each. Another play-off was then played to determine the winner. After a first encounter finished 0–0, Udinese lost a replay 2–1 but were awarded the win as Vicenza fielded an ineligible player, a Hungarian called Horwart. Udinese reached the finals in place of Vicenza.

In the final round, Udinese finished first and was promoted, alongside Parma, to First Division. In the following season, Udinese finished 10th and was relegated again. However, the format of the championship was again reformed and Udinese had another chance to reclaim their place in the top flight. They competed in play-offs with seven other sides for the right to play in Serie A. The winner would remain in the top flight. The club, however, lost the playoff against Legnano and lost their place in the top flight.

They remained in Second Division until the end of the 1928–29 season when Serie A and Serie B were created, with Udinese falling into the third tier (Terza Serie). The first season in Terza Serie was a triumphant one and Udinese were promoted up to Serie B.

1930s and 1940s
The stay in Serie B lasted only two years, and after the 1931–32 season, the team returned to the third division. Udinese remained in the third tier (later renamed Serie C in 1935) until 1938–39, when coming second in Girone Finale Nord di Serie C, they were promoted to Serie B.

The Zebrette remained in Serie B for a dozen years, with average performances and were relegated to Serie C at the end of the 1947–48 season due to a reform of the championships. This relegation, however, was followed by two consecutive promotions, and thanks to an excellent second-place finish in the Serie B 1949-50, the Friulani won a historic promotion to Serie A.

1950s: second place in A, and relegation back to B
Udinese remained in Serie A for five seasons and almost claimed an historic Scudetto in the 1954–55 season, when they came second only behind Milan. It was after that season, however, that Udinese was relegated because of an offence committed on 31 May 1953, the last day of the championship, which was exposed two years later. The Friuliani returned to Serie A after one season in B and in the following season was confirmed among the best Italian teams with an excellent fourth-place finish.

1960s and 1970s
A decline followed those good seasons, however, with Udinese first relegated back down to Serie B in 1961–62 and then to Serie C in 1963–64. Udinese remained in C for about fifteen years, missing promotion back to B on numerous occasions. It was only after the 1977–78 season that the Friuliani, led by manager Massimo Giacomini, returned to B winning Girone A. In the same season, they won the Coppa Italia Semiprofessionisti, beating Reggina and also won the Anglo-Italian Cup.

1980s: Mitropa Cup and the scandal of 1986
During the next season, Udinese with Massimo Giacomini as their manager, won Serie B and returned after more than two decades to Serie A. In their first year back after so long, the team survived after a disappointing 15th-place finish. In Europe, they fared much better, winning the Mitropa Cup, a European Cup for teams that had won the previous season of Serie B.

In subsequent seasons the team managed to survive relegation without any particular difficulty also managing an impressive sixth place in 1982–83. At that time Udinese had on its books one of the club's all-time greatest players, the Brazilian midfielder Zico.

At the end of the 1985–86 season, the team was embroiled in a betting scandal and was penalised nine points for the 1986–87 season. Despite a desperate comeback towards the end of the season, Udinese were relegated to Serie B. Had they not been deducted points, Udinese would have survived.

1990s and early 2000s: Europe

During the following years, Udinese were promoted to Serie A and relegated back to B on several occasions. This situation lasted until the 1995–96 season, from which point on, they established themselves in Serie A.

The 1996–97 season saw Udinese qualify for the UEFA Cup, with Alberto Zaccheroni as manager. The following season, they managed a third-place finish behind Juventus and Internazionale, largely thanks to Oliver Bierhoff's 27 goals.

In March 2001, Luciano Spalletti was appointed manager, replacing Luigi De Canio. Spalletti managed to lead the team to survival on the penultimate matchday. Following brief periods with Roy Hodgson and Giampiero Ventura on the bench, Spalletti was again appointed manager of Udinese at the beginning of the 2002–03 season, finding an organised and ambitious club which again reached the UEFA Cup, playing attacking and entertaining football.

The surprising fourth-place finish at the end of the 2004–05 season saw Udinese achieve their first qualification for the UEFA Champions League in the history of the club. At the end of that same season, Spalletti announced his intention to leave Udinese.

The following season, Udinese played in the Champions League preliminary round, beating Sporting CP 4–2 on aggregate. Udinese were drawn in a tough group alongside Panathinaikos, Werder Bremen and Barcelona.

 Despite a 3–0 win over Panathinaikos in their first match, courtesy of a Vincenzo Iaquinta hat trick, the team failed to qualify for the knockout rounds, coming in third in their group, equal on points with second placed Werder and behind eventual champions Barcelona.

Recent history
After a year in the Champions League, Udinese finished tenth and returned once more to mid-table mediocrity. The turning point occurred during the summer of 2007, when the club announced the appointment of Sicilian manager Pasquale Marino and also made various quality purchases including Fabio Quagliarella and Gökhan Inler.

The 2007–08 season started well with a draw at home against champions Internazionale, but the enthusiasm was quickly erased after the first home match which finished in a 5–0 loss to newly promoted Napoli. After this match, Udinese's fortunes changed, starting with a victory over Juventus thanks to a late Antonio Di Natale goal. Udinese remained in contention for the fourth Champions League spot with Milan, Fiorentina, and Sampdoria until the end of the season, but ultimately finished in seventh place, qualifying for the UEFA Cup.

At the start of the 2008–09 season, during the press conference to present the new season's kit, the new official website was also presented, and an absolute novelty in the Italian championship, the first Web TV channel dedicated to a football club called Udinese Channel was launched, totally free and visible worldwide.

In the 2008–09 season, Udinese had a mixed bag of results in Serie A with a 3–1 win at Roma and a 2–1 win over Juventus, but 10 losses against teams including Reggina, Chievo, and Torino dented their hopes of Champions League qualification. In the UEFA Cup, Udinese found themselves in a group with potential favourites Tottenham Hotspur, NEC, Spartak Moscow, and Dinamo Zagreb, but eased through the group with a convincing 2–0 win against Tottenham. They beat Lech Poznań in the next round 4–3 on aggregate, and then beat holders Zenit Saint Petersburg 2–1 on aggregate. In the quarter-final against Werder Bremen, with injuries to star players Antonio Di Natale, Samir Handanovič, and Felipe, they lost 6–4 on aggregate. Fabio Quagliarella managed eight goals in the campaign. They finished the season in seventh place, missing out on any European football the following year.

The 2009–10 season was an extremely disappointing one for players and fans alike. Even though Antonio Di Natale managed to score 29 goals in the league and finished top goalscorer, the season was spent battling against relegation. In the end, they finished in 15th, nine points and three places clear of the relegation zone. The only highlight of the campaign was reaching the semi-final of the Coppa Italia, beating Lumezzane in the round of 16, Milan in the quarter-finals, and eventually losing 2–1 to Roma on aggregate.

In the summer transfer window of 2010, Udinese sold Gaetano D'Agostino, Simone Pepe, Marco Motta, and Aleksandar Luković. They also brought in players that proved to be the key to their success in the 2010–11 Serie A; Mehdi Benatia and Pablo Armero, a central defender and wingback, respectively. After a poor start to the season, losing their first four games and drawing the fifth, Udinese went on to record their highest points total in history and finished in fourth place, again earning themselves a spot in the Champions League qualifying round. Di Natale, with 28 goals, became the first back-to-back capocannoniere since Lazio's Giuseppe Signori accomplished the feat in 1993 and 1994. A 0–0 home draw with Milan on the final matchday secured the Champions League spot for Udinese. Coach Francesco Guidolin kept his promise of "dancing like Boateng" if they qualified for the Champions League and did a little jig in the middle of the pitch. In the Coppa Italia, Udinese lost to Sampdoria in the round of 16 on penalties after the match ended 2–2.

The 2011–12 season continued in much the same fashion, even though Udinese lost three key players to larger clubs – Alexis Sánchez to Barcelona, Gökhan Inler to Napoli, and Cristián Zapata to Villarreal. In the Champions League qualifying round, Udinese were drawn against Arsenal and lost the away leg 1–0. At the Stadio Friuli, Udinese lost 2–1, 3–1 on aggregate, and entered the Europa League group stage, Antonio Di Natale missing a penalty that at the time would have taken Udinese through. Domestically, Udinese started strong but with their quality shown in defence, conceding the least of all teams after 15 games, only seven. For the second consecutive season, Udinese qualified for the Champions League, clinching third place on the final day of the season with a 2–0 away win against Catania. In the summer transfer window, key players Kwadwo Asamoah and Mauricio Isla were both sold to champions Juventus. The club failed to reach the group stage of the year's Champions League, however, losing on penalties after extra time to Portuguese club SC Braga. Antonio Di Natale scored 23 goals to record his third consecutive season with 20+ goals in Serie A.

Udinese started off the 2012–13 Serie A season in mixed form, with seven draws and three losses in their first thirteen games. However, starting in December the team began to pick up wins more frequently, concurrent with Di Natale finding the net on a regular basis. After a period of balancing wins with losses, the team went on a phenomenal eight game winning streak to end the season, with Luis Muriel emerging as a key player. Like the 2011–12 season, Di Natale again finished with 23 goals, becoming the first player since Gabriel Batistuta, of Fiorentina, to score 20 or more goals in four or more consecutive seasons.

Over the coming years, Udinese would go on to finish middle to lower table in Serie A. In the 2017–18 season, Udinese manager Massimo Oddo was sacked after the club lost 11 straight games. Oddo was then replaced by Igor Tudor who guided the club to safety away from the relegation places.

Honours

National

League
 Serie BWinners (3): 1924–25, 1955–56, 1978–79Serie C
Winners (3): 1929–30, 1948–49, 1977–78

Cups
Coppa Italia Serie C
Winners (1): 1977–78

International

UEFA Intertoto Cup
Winners (1): 2000

Other Titles
Anglo-Italian Cup
Winners (1): 1978
Mitropa Cup
Winners (1): 1979–80

Divisional movements

Stadiums

 Stadio Moretti (1924–76)
 Stadio Friuli (1976–Present)

Players

Current squad

Out on loan

Notable players

The following is a provisional list of players that were international while playing for Udinese, sorted by nationality.

Coaching staff

Managerial history

References

External links

 
Udinese Calcio at Serie A 
Udinese Calcio at UEFA.com

 
Football clubs in Italy
Udinese
Association football clubs established in 1896
Udinese
Udinese
Udinese
Udinese
1896 establishments in Italy
Sport in Udine
Coppa Italia Serie C winning clubs
UEFA Intertoto Cup winning clubs